Lithospermum latifolium is a species of flowering plant in the borage family known by the common names American gromwell and American stoneseed. Its native range is centered in the Midwestern United States, where it is found in calcareous forests. It is a hairy, tall perennial herb that produces small yellow flowers in late spring.

Lithospermum latifolium is a conservative species that is uncommon throughout its range. It is generally restricted to areas of high quality native vegetation.

References

External links
USDA Plants Profile

latifolium
Flora of the United States
Flora of Canada